The Rho Psi Society is an honorary Greek letter fraternity. Although founded as a student society, it is no longer active at the collegiate level. The objectives of the Society are to promote and perpetuate friendship among members; to develop congeniality and brotherhood in the fraternal life; and to cultivate the spirit of cooperation and self-sacrifice.

History
Su Yu She, the (Society for Respecting Friends) was founded in 1916 at Cornell University in Ithaca, New York as a general club for male students of Chinese descent, with its Chinese name. The original founders, Chih Ping, L. N. Lau, Y. C. Yang, K. C. Lay, and C. K. Cheng, were all of Chinese origin. The name was changed to Rho Psi Fraternity in 1918.

The Founders of Rho Psi may have sought, but been excluded from the fraternities of the time, but it is more likely that they sought formation of their own group for cultural affinity faced with a very small population of collegians of the same ethnic background. Mirroring society, colleges and universities, housing and dining halls, and Greek Letter organizations were all more insular in Rho Psi's founding era. This common campus culture didn't shift toward a more integrated approach until the ethnic, religious and racial social mixing that occurred with the massive return of more integration-minded GIs after WWII.  

Rho Psi was the first club with Greek letters for Asian students in what is now the Ivy League.  It was a pioneer, established long before most multicultural or cultural-affinity Greek Letter organizations.

The Alpha chapter, which maintained a house, existed on the Cornell campus until 1931. Rho Psi became national in 1925 with the establishment of another chapter in New York City, and the fraternity gained international status in 1929 with a chapter in Shanghai. It appears in four editions of Baird's Manual of American College Fraternities.

At its 1976 convention in State College, Pennsylvania, Su Yu She adopted the name Rho Psi Society, and at the same time, voted that women would be admitted to membership. 

In 2009 Rho Psi was rechartered at the University of Alabama as the Sigma chapter.

There are now a large number of collegiate Asian-American clubs.

Chapters
Chapters of Rho Psi include the following.  Chapters in bold are active, chapters in italics are inactive.

References

1916 establishments in New York (state)
Asian-American history
Asian-American fraternities and sororities
Fraternities and sororities in the United States
Cornell University student organizations
Student organizations established in 1916